Ruggero Berti (January 28, 1909 – December 29, 1985) was an American cyclist who competed in the 1932 Summer Olympics.

References

External links
 

1909 births
1985 deaths
American male cyclists
Olympic cyclists of the United States
Cyclists at the 1932 Summer Olympics
People from San Jose, California
Cyclists from California